Junior warden may refer to:
one of the churchwardens in the vestry of an Anglican church
one of the officers of a Masonic lodge

See also
Senior Warden (disambiguation)

Disambiguation pages